The House at 197 Hornbine Road in Rehoboth, Massachusetts, is the town's finest example of 19th-century Italianate style.

Description and history 
The -story, wood-framed house was built in about 1890 by a member of the locally prominent Baker family. It has bracketed eaves and round-arch windows in the front-facing gables, all characteristic of the style, and it retains much of its interior period detail. The front door is original, as is the bracketed hood that shelters it. As of 2017, the twelve-room house is valued at about $338,000.

The house was built listed on the National Register of Historic Places on June 6, 1983.

See also
National Register of Historic Places listings in Bristol County, Massachusetts

References

Houses in Bristol County, Massachusetts
Buildings and structures in Rehoboth, Massachusetts
Houses on the National Register of Historic Places in Bristol County, Massachusetts